Dynamo was a Huss Breakdance ride located in the Forbidden Valley area of the Alton Towers theme park. It was the first ride seen to the left when entering the area, and was opposite to Ripsaw, which was a Huss Top Spin.

History

AstroDancer in Fantasy World and Festival Park
Dynamo first opened in 1993 replacing the Cine 2000 as AstroDancer and was located in the Fantasy World (now known as X-Sector) section of the park. The ride was extremely popular and brought in a lot of guests. However, at the end of the 1996 season, the ride was removed along with the Pirate Ship to make way for Oblivion, the world's first vertical drop roller coaster. AstroDancer returned in Festival Park in 1997 behind Energizer and Wave Swinger still proving to be popular.

DinoDancer in UG Land
In 1999, Festival Park was re-themed into UG Land. AstroDancer was also refurbished to fit in with the pre-historic theme and was renamed to DinoDancer. During this period, the ride's popularity was high due to being situated in a newly themed area. After two seasons, the ride was removed in 2000 to make way for the newly refurbished Mondial Supernova, Boneshaker, and did not return for the 2001 season.

Dynamo in Forbidden Valley
After DinoDancer was removed from UG Land in 2000, the ride surprisingly returned in 2002 in Forbidden Valley as Dynamo. Once relocated here, the ride started to show its age and was no longer popular due to better rides being in the area. The ride also became very unreliable, and it eventually closed and was removed at the end of the 2003 season. The ride was moved to an area behind the Monorail garage near Duel - The Haunted House Strikes Back before being stored in the car park until 2005 when it was sold to Mondial.

Replacements

Hot air balloon plans
Alton Towers had proposed a hot air balloon ride to replace Dynamo in 2004 but the plans were declined due to the new height restriction given to the park. Consequently, the park installed a golf mini-game where guests could win prizes.

Lava Lump
In 2006, the mini-golf game was temporarily moved to Katanga Canyon but removed shortly after. The park's rock climbing wall located in UG Land, Rock Shot, was relocated to Forbidden Valley and renamed Lava Lump. In 2008, trampolines were added to the area around Lava Lump.

Nemesis: Sub Terra
In 2012, Lava Lump and the trampolines were removed and a permanent attraction was finally built in replacement of Dynamo. The currently closed Nemesis: Sub-Terra is a well themed drop ride manufactured by ABC Rides. Later in the year, a horror maze named Sub Species: The End Games was brought to the Scarefest Halloween event based around Nemesis: Sub Terra.

References

Amusement rides manufactured by HUSS Park Attractions
Amusement rides introduced in 1993
Amusement rides that closed in 2003
Alton Towers